Thomasia paniculata, commonly known as few-flowered thomasia, is a species of flowering plant in the family Malvaceae and is endemic to the south-west of Western Australia. It is a slender, erect or straggling shrub with egg-shaped leaves and pink to purple, occasionally white flowers.

Description
The edges of the leaves are wavy, sometimes lobed and both sides are covered with scattered rust-coloured, star-shaped hairs. The sepals are pink to purple, occasionally white, and covered with star-shaped hairs. Flowering occurs from August to February.

Taxonomy
Thomasia pauciflora was first formally described in 1839 by John Lindley in A Sketch of the Vegetation of the Swan River Colony. The specific epithet (pauciflora) means "few-flowered".

Distribution and habitat
This thomasia usually grows as an understorey plant in winter-wet areas and swamps in jarrah and marri woodland and is widespread mainly from Perth to near Albany in the Esperance Plains, Jarrah Forest, Swan Coastal Plain and Warren bioregions of south-western Western Australia.

Conservation status
Thomasia pauciflora is listed as "not threatened" by the Government of Western Australia Department of Biodiversity, Conservation and Attractions.

References

Rosids of Western Australia
Plants described in 1839
pauciflora
Taxa named by John Lindley